There were several video and audio recordings released by Osama bin Laden between 2001 and 2011.

Most of the tapes were released directly (by mail or messenger) to Arabic language satellite television networks, primarily al Jazeera.

Audio or videos

October 7, 2001 
Just after US and NATO forces launched strikes in Afghanistan, bin Laden released a video tape, stating that "America has been hit by god at its most vulnerable point, destroying, thank God, its most prestigious buildings," referencing the September 11 attacks on the United States. Bin Laden did not claim responsibility for the attacks in the recording.

December 13, 2001 

On November 10, 2001, U.S. military forces in Jalalabad found a video tape of bin Laden.

On December 13, 2001, the United States State Department released a video tape apparently showing bin Laden speaking with Khaled al-Harbi and other associates, somewhere in Afghanistan, before the U.S. invasion had driven the Taliban regime from Kandahar. The State Department stated that the tape was captured by U.S. forces in Afghanistan during a raid on a house in Jalalabad. The tape was aired with an accompanying English translation. In this translation, Osama bin Laden displays knowledge of the timing of the actual attack a few days in advance;  the translation attributes the following lines to bin Laden:
"we calculated in advance the number of casualties from the enemy, who would be killed based on the position of the tower. We calculated that the floors that would be hit would be three or four floors. I was the most optimistic of them all.... We had notification since the previous Thursday that the event would take place that day. We had finished our work that day and had the radio on.... Muhammad (Atta) from the Egyptian family (meaning the Al Qaida Egyptian group), was in charge of the group.... The brothers, who conducted the operation, all they knew was that they have a martyrdom operation and we asked each of them to go to America but they didn't know anything about the operation, not even one letter. But they were trained and we did not reveal the operation to them until they are there and just before they boarded the planes."
On December 20, 2001, German TV channel "Das Erste" broadcast an analysis of the White House's translation of the videotape. On the program "Monitor", two independent translators and an expert on oriental studies found the White House's translation to be both inaccurate and manipulative stating "At the most important places where it is held to prove the guilt of bin Laden, it is not identical with the Arabic" and that the words used that indicate foreknowledge can not be heard at all in the original. Prof. Gernot Rotter, professor of Islamic and Arabic Studies at the Asia-Africa Institute at the University of Hamburg said "The American translators who listened to the tapes and transcribed them apparently wrote a lot of things in that they wanted to hear but that cannot be heard on the tape no matter how many times you listen to it."

In the recording, bin Laden describes attacks by the United States against Islamic people. He describes his message as a review of events following 9/11, and in this statement, he neither admits nor denies responsibility for the attacks.

February 11, 2003 
Colin Powell told a United States Senate panel that he'd reviewed a transcript of a message from bin Laden stating that he was in "a partnership with Iraq", which was to be broadcast on al Jazeera. Al Jazeera initially said they did not have the tape, but then said they received it the same day and broadcast it that evening at 8pm GMT. The quality of the recording was said to sound like bin Laden and to be "quite good" by The Guardian but "poor quality" by the BBC.

October 29, 2004 

Shortly before the U.S. presidential election on October 29, 2004, Arab television network al Jazeera broadcast an 18-minute video tape of Osama bin Laden, addressed to citizens of the United States. According to the English translation distributed by the BBC and other media outlets, he tells viewers he personally directed the 19 hijackers, and describes his motivation:

I will explain to you the reasons behind these events, and I will tell you the truth about the moments when this decision was taken, so that you can reflect on it. God knows that the plan of striking the towers had not occurred to us, but the idea came to me when things went just too far with the American-Israeli alliance's oppression and atrocities against our people in Palestine and Lebanon.

Bin Laden claimed he was inspired to destroy the World Trade Center after watching the destruction of towers in Lebanon by Israel during the 1982 Lebanon War.

November 3, 2004 
Bin Laden released another video tape, excoriating the West, the United Nations, and Israel, and explaining all of the unfolding events as fundamentally a religious war.

January 19, 2006 

Al Jazeera broadcast an audiotape of bin Laden addressing citizens of the United States again.

April 23, 2006 
Al Jazeera broadcast parts of an audiotape. On this tape, bin Laden accuses the Western world of waging a Zionist crusade against Islam. He comments on Hamas, Darfur and the situation in Iraq.

May 23, 2006 
Al Jazeera broadcast a 5-minute audiotape from bin Laden, where he claims he, alone, assigned the hijackers to perform the September 11 attacks. bin Laden comments on the trial of Zacarias Moussaoui, the prisoners in Guantanamo Bay, and the imprisoned journalists Sami al-Hajj and Tayssir Alouni, denying that any of them (apart from a few Guantanamo Bay prisoners) were connected with al-Qaeda.

bin Laden tells viewers that Zacarias Moussaoui "had no connection at all with September 11. I am the one in charge of the 19 brothers and I never assigned brother Zacarias to be with them in that mission. I am certain of what I say because I was responsible for entrusting the 19 brothers... with the raids."

June 30, 2006 
An Islamist website posted a recording, in which bin Laden praised Abu Musab al-Zarqawi as a "lion of Jihad". The 19-minute video shows a still picture of bin Laden next to video celebrating al-Zarqawi. US officials said that the tape was authentic.

July 14, 2007 
A few days after the Lal Masjid siege by the Pakistani government (and after a video released by al-Zawahiri), bin Laden released a tape. He was shown with a fatigued expression. He came out in a video clip less than a minute long on a militant website. BBC News reports that it was "undated and correspondents say it may be re-run footage. Its authenticity also cannot be independently verified."

September 11, 2007 

A second video appeared purportedly featuring a eulogy by bin Laden to 9/11 hijacker Waleed al-Shehri. In the video, a voice identified as bin Laden's delivers the 14-minute introduction. The voice is heard over a still picture of bin Laden, dressed and groomed as he appears in the September 7, 2007, video. The 33-minute balance of the recording is a video will read by al-Shehri.

September 20, 2007 

An audio tape appeared with bin Laden's voice over previously released footage of him. In the audio tape, bin Laden called on Pakistanis to overthrow President Pervez Musharraf, promising what he called retaliation for the storming of the Red Mosque in the capital, Islamabad, in July.

November 29, 2007 
An audio tape appeared purportedly by bin Laden has urged European countries to end their military involvement in Afghanistan.

December 29, 2007 
In an audiotape Osama bin Laden warned Iraq's Sunni Arabs against fighting al-Qaeda and vowed to expand the group's Jihad to Israel, threatening "blood for blood, destruction for destruction."

The title of this message is "The Way To Frustrate The Conspiracies."

March 19, 2008 
On March 19, 2008, an audio tape appeared purportedly by al-Qaeda leader Osama bin Laden "threatens" the EU over the re-printing of a cartoon offensive to Muslims.

The title of this message is "May our Mothers be bereaved of us if we fail to help our Prophet." Its full transcript and tape is located at

March 20, 2008 
On March 20, 2008, a second audio tape appeared purportedly by al-Qaeda leader Osama bin Laden urging Palestinian militants to join the insurgency in Iraq.

May 16, 2008 
On May 16, 2008, an audio tape appeared purportedly by al-Qaeda leader Osama bin Laden issued to the Western People: "Reasons of the struggle on the occasion of the 60th anniversary of the founding of the occupying state of Israel" The message is 22 minutes, 41 seconds long. The message addresses the 60th anniversary of the founding of the state of Israel.

May 18, 2008 
On May 18, 2008, a second audio tape appeared purportedly by al-Qaeda leader Osama bin Laden issued 'A very strong statement to the Islamic nation and Muslims'. The second in three days, once again is an audio message, with no new imagery of bin Laden seen. A video version of the message was released showing an older still image of bin Laden while an audio message plays in the background.

January 14, 2009 
On January 14, 2009, a new audio recording purportedly by bin Laden posted on Islamist websites called for a new jihad over the Israeli offensive in Gaza and said the global financial crisis has exposed the waning influence of the United States in world affairs and that it will in turn weaken its ally Israel. The recording was accompanied by a still photo of Bin Laden superimposed over the al-Aqsa mosque in Jerusalem.

June 3, 2009 
According to a recording aired by Al Jazeera on June 3, Bin Laden made a statement against President Barack Obama.

September 13, 2009 
On September 13, 2009, an audio recording purportedly by Osama Bin Laden was released on an Islamist website.

For a transcript, see Bin Laden Statement (September 13, 2009).

September 25, 2009 
On September 25, 2009, a forum participant posted to a jihadist website links to download an audio statement from al-Qaeda leader Osama Bin Ladin. The statement, entitled "A Message From Shaykh Osama Bin Ladin to the People of Europe," is 4 minutes, 47 seconds, and in Arabic with German and English subtitles available. The video shows a still photograph of Bin Laden.

For a transcript, see Bin Laden Statement (September 25, 2009)

January 24, 2010 
New audio tape released to al-Jazeera news features a voice claiming to be Osama bin Laden taking credit for the attempted bombing by Umar Farouk Abdulmutallab.  The authenticity of the tape has not yet been verified.

January 29, 2010 
A tape allegedly (remains unverified) from bin Laden was released by al-Jazeera, in which the leader of al-Qaeda excoriated the U.S. for its reluctance to address climate change.  Bin Laden called for a worldwide boycott of American goods and the United States dollar in order to have a huge impact on the American economy.

March 25, 2010 
Another new audio tape allegedly from bin Laden was released by al-Jazeera. In this tape, the leader of al-Qaeda threatened that the execution of Khalid Sheikh Mohammed would result in al-Qaeda indefinitely murdering Americans in the event of their "falling into our hands".

October 1, 2010 
An audiotape allegedly featuring the voice of bin Laden surfaced on the Internet and addresses the flooding in Pakistan. The 11-minute tape, posted on militant websites Friday, focused on relief efforts and what can be done to prevent future natural disasters. In the recording, bin Laden reportedly urges a change in how governments execute relief work and calls for the creation of a relief group to study Muslim regions located near rivers and low-lying areas. He also calls for a greater investment in agriculture. The U.S.-based SITE Intelligence Group, which monitors jihadi forums, says the latest message is heard in a video featuring a photograph of bin Laden superimposed over images of aid distribution.

October 2, 2010 
The audio of a follow up speech allegedly by Osama bin Laden was released onto the internet. The title of the speech was "Help Your Pakistani Brothers" in which he expressed his feeling that the response of Arab and Muslim leaders to the Pakistani's affected by the flooding "did not match the level of the disaster" and that more people are affected by climate change than wars. The authenticity of the tape has not been independently verified.

January 21, 2011 

On January 21, 2011, Osama bin Laden said the release of French hostages depends on a pullout of France's soldiers in Afghanistan and warned Paris of a "high price" for its policies, in a tape broadcast on Friday. "We repeat the same message to you: The release of your prisoners in the hands of our brothers is linked to the withdrawal of your soldiers from our country," said the speaker on the audiotape broadcast on Al-Jazeera television. This was the final tape released by Bin Laden prior to the confirmation of his death on May 2, 2011. A new audio message that Osama Bin Laden recorded before his death was released on May 7, 2011.

May 19, 2011 
A recording purported to have been made by Osama bin Laden shortly before he died has been released by al-Qaeda. In the message, he praised the revolutions in Tunisia and Egypt and speaks of a "rare historic opportunity" for Muslims to rise up. The 12-minute audio message came out on a video posted on Islamist websites, and has been 
translated by the SITE Institute.

References

External links 
 All al-Qaeda / As-Sahab video productions
 Strategic Translations of Bin Laden, Zarqawi, and other terrorists by Laura Mansfield
 CNN.com Tapes shed new light on bin Laden's network
 BBC transcripts and news items of the December 13, 2001, tape
 US Government transcript of the December 13, 2001, tape (PDF)
 Excerpts from the 'Bin Laden' audio tape Guardian resume of January 19, 2006, tape.
 Guardian about Moussaoui and Guantanamo Bay of May 23, 2006, tape.
 Guardian May 23 tape 2006 about Sami al-Hajj and Tayssir Alouni
 Praise for Zarqawi in new 'Bin Laden' broadcast Guardian resume of June 30, 2006, tape.
 Guardian Unlimited List of all al-Qaida tapes through June 2006.
 "Bin Laden Re-emerges, Warning U.S. While Offering 'Truce'" by Hassan Fattah and Douglas Jehl, The New York Times,  retrieved January 19, 2006

 
Al-Qaeda propaganda
21st century-related lists